Japanese festivals are traditional festive occasions often celebrated with dance and music in Japan. Many festivals have their roots in traditional Chinese festivals, but have undergone extensive changes over time to have little resemblance to their original form, despite sharing the same name and date. There are also various local festivals (e.g. Tobata Gion) that are mostly unknown outside a given prefecture.

Unlike most people in East Asia, Japanese people generally do not celebrate the Lunar New Year, its observance having been supplanted by the Western New Year's Day on January 1 in the late 19th century (see Japanese New Year); however, many continue to observe several of its cultural practices. Many Chinese residents in Japan, as well as more traditional shrines and temples, still celebrate the Lunar New Year in parallel with the Western New Year. In Yokohama Chinatown, Japan's biggest Chinatown, tourists from all over Japan come to enjoy the festival, similar to Nagasaki's Lantern Festival based in Nagasaki Chinatown.

Events within festivals
Festivals are often based around one event, with food stalls, entertainment, and carnival games to keep people entertained.  Some are based around temples or shrines, others hanabi (fireworks), and still others around contests where the participants sport loin cloths (see: Hadaka Matsuri).

Local festivals (matsuri)

 is the Japanese word for a festival or holiday. In Japan, festivals are usually sponsored by a local shrine or temple, though they can be secular.

There are no specific matsuri days for all of Japan; dates vary from area to area, and even within a specific area, but festival days do tend to cluster around traditional holidays such as Setsubun or Obon. Almost every locale has at least one matsuri in late summer/early autumn, usually related to the paddy harvest.

Notable matsuri often feature processions which may include elaborate floats. Preparation for these processions is usually organized at the level of neighborhoods, or machi. Prior to these, the local kami may be ritually installed in mikoshi and paraded through the streets.

One can always find in the vicinity of a matsuri booths selling souvenirs and food such as takoyaki, and games, such as Goldfish scooping. Karaoke contests, sumo matches, and other forms of entertainment are often organized in conjunction with matsuri. If the festival is next to a lake, renting a boat is also an attraction.

Favorite elements of the most popular matsuri, such as the Nada no Kenka Matsuri of Himeji or the Neputa Matsuri of Hirosaki, are often broadcast on television for the entire nation to enjoy.

List of famous matsuri

Sapporo Snow Festival (Hokkaido)
Sapporo Snow Festival is one of the largest festivals of the year in Sapporo, held in February for one week. It began in 1950 when high school students built snow statues in Odori Park, central Sapporo. The event is now very large and commercialized. About a dozen large sculptures are built for the festival along with around 100 smaller snow and ice sculptures. Several concerts and other events are also held.

Lake Towada Snow Festival
This lake festival is held in the beginning of February. Held in the town of Yasumiya, this festival is on the south side of Lake Towada (near the wooden statues). This festival is open all day, but at 5 pm one can enjoy activities such as going through a snow maze, exploring a Japanese igloo, and eat foods from Aomori and Akita prefectures. There is a fireworks show and events held on an ice stage.

Aomori Nebuta Festival
This festival is held annually and features colorful lantern floats called nebuta which are pulled through the streets of Central Aomori. This festival is held from about August 2–7 every year. This event attracts millions of visitors. During this festival, 20 large nebuta floats are paraded through the streets near Aomori JR rail station. These floats are constructed of wooden bases and metal frames. Japanese papers, called washi, are painted onto the frames. These amazing floats are finished off with the historical figures or kabuki being painted on the paper. These floats can take up to a year to complete. There is a dance portion of this festival. There are haneto dancers and they wear special costumes for this dance. Everyone is welcome to purchase their own haneto costume that they may too join in on the fun (Mishima, Aomori Nebuta Festival).

Nango Summer Jazz Festival
This event is held every year. Thousands of artists from all over Tohoku and even further regions come to Nango to perform. This is the largest open-air jazz concert held in Tohoku region. This festival began in 1989, in a small venue indoors. There was such a large response from the fans that it was expanded into a large annual festival. One must purchase tickets for this event (Bernard, 2007). This summer jazz festival doesn't cost anything but potential members of the public still need to receive a ticket to enter the event.

Cherry blossom festivals
Japan celebrates the entire season of the cherry blossoms. There are festivals in nearly every region of Japan, and some locations, food is available or a park may be decorated with lanterns.
Some locations of cherry blossom festivals include:
Yaedake Cherry Blossom Festival in Okinawa. This festival takes place from late January – mid February
Matsuyama Shiroyama Koen Cherry Blossom Festival in Matsuyama-city, Ehime. This festival takes place early April.
Matsue Jozan Koen Festival in Matsue-city, Shimane. This festival has a feature of illuminating the cherry blossom trees at night. This festival takes place late March-early April.
Tsuyama Kakuzan Koen Cherry Blossom Festival in Tsuyama-city, Okayama. Japanese tea ceremonies and music performers are held at these festivals. This festival is held early-mid April.
Takato Joshi Koen Cherry Blossom Festival in Takato-machi Ina-city, Nagano prefecture. The trees in this region have pink blossoms. This festival is held early April.
Takada Koen Cherry Blossom Festival in Joetsu-city, Niigata prefecture. This festival is held early-mid April.
Kitakai Tenshochi Cherry Blossom Festival in Kitakami-city, Iwate. This festival is held mid April-early May.
Hirosaki Cherry Blossom Festival held in Hirosaki Koen Hirosaki-city, Aomori prefecture. This festival is held late April-early May (Mishima, Cherry Blossom Festivals 2010).

Outside Japan
Following the Japanese diaspora, many places around the world celebrate similar festivals, often called . Brazil hosts the largest  population in the world and some Brazilian cities host  such as São Paulo and Curitiba. The United States host the 2nd largest  population in the world and some American cities host  such as Los Angeles, San Jose and Phoenix. Wales has adopted the term  to name their yearly drift festival. It uses the Japanese name to show the sports Japanese heritage. The event takes place over 2 days at the Anglesey Track, and has been annual for 6 years.

Hadaka Matsuri
The origins of Hadaka Matsuri date back 500 years when worshippers competed to receive paper talismans called Go-o thrown by the priest. These paper talismans were tokens of the completion of New Year ascetic training by the priests. As those people receiving these paper talismans had good things happen to them, the number of people requesting them increased year by year. However, as paper is easily destroyed, the talismans were changed to the wooden ofuda that we know today.

Naoi-shinji, also known as "Hadaka Matsuri (naked festival)", started in the year 767 AD, the Nara Period. This right was founded on the fact that the governor of Owari Province (presently Aichi Prefecture) visited the Owari Ōkunitama Shrine (Konomiya shrine) to drive away evil spirits and calamities, because Emperor Shotoku ordered all the kokubun-ji* to offer invocations to dispel plagues.

It is said that the form of the festival, a struggle to touch the Naoinin or Shin-otoko (man of god), is reminiscent of the struggle in old times between the assemblage of lower-ranking Shinto priests called shanin and contributors tried to catch and set up a man for naoinin (shin-otoko), an unlucky poor man, who was unwilling to take the role.

Nationwide festivals

Fixed days
Seijin Shiki: Coming of Age Day (second Monday of January)
Hinamatsuri: Doll Festival (March 3)
Hanami: Flower Viewing (late March to early May)
Hanamatsuri: Flower Festival (April 8)
Tanabata: Star Festival (July 7)
Shichi-Go-San: festival day for children aged seven, five and three (November 15)
Ōmisoka: New Year's Eve (December 31)

Multiple days
Setsubun: division of season (beginning of each of the four seasons) (February 3)
Ennichi: temple fair (holidays related to Kami and/or Buddha)

Bunka
Japanese Cultural Festival

Date: January 1–3 (related celebrations take place throughout January)

Other Names: Oshōgatsu (O is an honorific prefix)

Information: New Year observances are the most elaborate of Japan's annual events. Before the New Year, homes are cleaned, debts are paid off, and osechi (food in lacquered trays for the New Year) is prepared or bought. Osechi foods are traditional foods which are chosen for their lucky colors, shapes, or lucky-sounding names in hopes of obtaining good luck in various areas of life during the new year. Homes are decorated and the holidays are celebrated by family gatherings, visits to temples or shrines, and formal calls on relatives and friends. The first day of the year (ganjitsu) is usually spent with members of the family.

People try to stay awake and eat toshikoshi soba, noodles to be eaten at midnight. People also visit Buddhist temples and Shinto shrines. Traditionally three are visited. This is called sansha-mairi. In the Imperial Palace at dawn on the 1st, the Emperor performs the rite of shihōhai (worship of the four-quarters), in which he offers prayers for the well-being of the nation. On January 2 the public is allowed to enter the inner palace grounds; the only other day this is possible is the Emperor's birthday (February 23). On the 2nd and 3rd days acquaintances visit one another to extend greetings (nenshi) and sip otoso (a spiced rice wine). Some games played at New Year's are karuta (a card game), hanetsuki (similar to badminton), tako age (kiteflying), and komamawashi (spinning tops). These games are played to bring more luck for the year. Exchanging New Year's greeting cards (similar to Christmas Cards) is another important Japanese custom. Also special allowances are given to children, which are called otoshidama. They also decorate their entrances with kagami mochi (two mochi rice balls placed one on top of the other, with a tangerine on top), and kadomatsu (pine tree decorations).

A later New Year's celebration, Koshōgatsu, literally means "Small New Year" and starts with the first full moon of the year (around January 15). The main events of Koshōgatsu are rites and practices praying for a bountiful harvest.

Date: March 3

Other Names:  (3rd month Festival),  (Peach Festival),  (Girls' Festival)

Information: This is the day when families pray for the happiness and prosperity of their girls and to help ensure that they grow up healthy and beautiful. The celebration takes place both inside the home and at the seashore. Both parts are meant to ward off evil spirits from girls. Young girls put on their best kimono and visit their friends' homes.

Date: April

Other Names: Hanami (flower viewing), Cherry Blossom Festival

Information: Various flower festivals are held at Shinto shrines during the month of April. Excursions and picnics for enjoying flowers, particularly cherry blossoms are also common, as well as many drinking parties often to be seen in and around auspicious parks and buildings. In some areas the peach blossom, the traditional flower of Japan (the Cherry being a symbol from the Edo period symbolizing the Samurai culture), is viewed as well though these flowers earlier than the Cherry. In some places flower viewing parties are held on traditionally fixed dates. This is one of the most popular events during spring. The subject of flower viewing has long held an important place in literature, dance, and fine arts. Ikebana (flower arrangement) is also a popular part of Japanese culture and is still practiced by many people today. Some main things people do during this event are games, folk songs, folk dance, flower displays, rides, parades, concerts, kimono shows, booths with food and other things, beauty pageant, and religious ceremonies. Families go out during weekends to see the cherry blossoms, and participate in the many festivals and activities.

Date: April 8

Other Names: Flower Festival
Information: Hanamatsuri celebrates the birth of the Buddha.  On this day, all temples hold 降誕会 (Gōtan-e), 仏生会 (Busshō-e), 浴仏会 (Yokubutsu-e), 龍華会 (Ryūge-e) and 花会式 (Hana-eshiki). Japanese people pour ama-cha (a beverage prepared from a variety of hydrangea) on small Buddha statues decorated with flowers, as if bathing a newborn baby. The tradition of bathing the Buddha originated in China and was introduced to Japan where it was first held in Nara in 606. Lion dancing is also a major tradition practiced during Buddha's Birthday and has become associated with the festival in Japan.

Date: July 7 / August 5–8 (Sendai)

Other Names: The Star Festival
Information: It originated from a Chinese folk legend concerning two stars-the Weaver Star (Vega) and the Cowherd Star (Altair)-who were said to be lovers who could meet only once a year on the 7th night of the 7th month provided it didn't rain and flood the Milky Way. It was named Tanabata after a weaving maiden from a Japanese legend, named Orihime who was believed to make clothes for the gods. People often write wishes and romantic aspirations on long, narrow strips of colored paper and hang them on bamboo branches along with other small ornaments.

Date: July 19

Information: One traditional custom to mark the end of the Bon Festival. Small paper lanterns containing a burning flame are either set afloat to a river, lake or sea or they are let go and float away into the night. Their light is intended to guide the way for deceased family members' spirits. Usually the person who lets the lantern go will write a message on the side.

Date: August 13–16

Information: A Buddhist observance honoring the spirits of ancestors. Usually a "spirit altar" (shōryōdana) is set up in front of the Butsudan (buddhist altar) to welcome the ancestors' souls. A priest may be asked to come and read a sutra (tanagyō). Among the traditional preparations for the ancestors' return are the cleaning of grave sites. The welcoming fire (mukaebi) built on the 13th and the send-off fire (okuribi) built on the 15th and 16th are intended to guide the ancestor's spirits back to their permanent dwelling place.

Date: October-

Information: The Japanese tradition of going to visit scenic areas where leaves have turned red in the Autumn.  The tradition is said to have originated in the Heian era as a cultured pursuit.

Date: November 11

Information: The Japanese tradition of buying and eating Pocky sticks.

Date: November 15

Information: Three- and seven-year-old girls and five-year-old boys are taken to the local shrine to pray for their safe and healthy future. This festival started because of the belief that children of certain ages were especially prone to bad luck and hence in need of divine protection. Children are usually dressed in traditional clothing for the occasion and after visiting the shrine many people buy chitose-ame ("thousand-year candy") sold at the shrine.

Preparation for the New Year and Year-end fair
Date: late December

Other Names: , 

Information: Preparations for seeing in the new year were originally undertaken to greet the toshigami, or deity of the incoming year. These begin on December 13, when the house was given a thorough cleaning; the date is usually nearer the end of the month now. The house is then decorated in the traditional fashion: A sacred rope of straw (shimenawa) with dangling white paper strips (shide) is hung over the front door to prevent evil spirits from entering and to show the presence of the toshigami. It is also customary to place kadomatsu, an arrangement of tree sprigs, beside the entrance way. A special altar, known as toshidana ("year shelf"), is piled high with kagamimochi (flat, round rice cakes), sake (rice wine), persimmons, and other foods in honor of the toshigami. A fair is traditionally held in late December at shrines, temples or in local neighborhoods. This is in preparation for the new year holidays. Decorations and sundry goods are sold at the fair. Originally these year-end fairs provided opportunities for farmers, fisherfolk and mountain dwellers to exchange goods and buy clothes and other necessities for the coming year.

Date: December 31 (New Year's Eve)

Information: People do the general house cleaning (Ōsōji) to welcome coming year and not to keep having impure influences. Many people visit Buddhist temples to hear the temple bells rung 108 times at midnight (joya no kane). This is to announce the passing of the old year and the coming of the new. The reason they are rung 108 times is because of the Buddhist belief that human beings are plagued by 108 earthly desires or passions (bonnō). With each ring one desire is dispelled. It is also a custom to eat toshikoshi soba in the hope that one's family fortunes will extend like the long noodles.

See also
 List of festivals in Japan
 Abare Festival
 Culture of Japan
 Naked festival
 Japanese calendar
 Jinjitsu and Nanakusa-no-sekku
 Subaru Cherry Blossom Festival of Greater Philadelphia
 National Cherry Blossom Festival, Washington, D.C.
 Kōhaku maku
 Sakai Matsuri

References

Further reading
mothra.rerf.or.jp::hiroshima::about matsuri an external article covering the topic
2008 Ministry of Land, I. T. (n.d.). 2008 Chitose-Lake Shikotsu Ice Festival. Retrieved August 6, 2009, from Yokoso! Japan Weeks: http://www.yjw2008.jp/eng/info.php?no=241
Bernard, S. (July 11, 2007). Nango Holds Summer Jazz Festival. Retrieved August 9, 2009, from About.com: https://web.archive.org/web/20110612014351/http://www.misawa.af.mil/news/story_print.asp?id=123060239
Gianola, D. (February 3, 2008). Chitose Lake Shikotsu Ice Festival. Retrieved August 6, 2009, from VR Mag: http://www.vrmag.org/issue29/CHITOSE_LAKE_SHIKOTSU_ICE_FESTIVAL.html 
Japan-Guide.com. (n.d.). Sapporo Snow Festival. Retrieved August 6, 2009, from Japan-Guide.com: http://www.japan-guide.com/e/e5311.html
MisawaJapan.com. (n.d.). Lake Towada Winter Festival. Retrieved August 6, 2009, from MisawaJapan.com: http://www.misawajapan.com/festivals/others/towada_winter.asp
Mishima, S. (n.d.). Aomori Nebuta Festival. Retrieved August 9, 2009, from About.com: https://web.archive.org/web/20090227134339/http://gojapan.about.com/cs/tohokuregion1/a/aomorinebuta.htm
Mishima, S. (n.d.). Cherry Blossom Festivals 2010. Retrieved August 9, 2009, from About.com: http://gojapan.about.com/cs/cherryblossoms/a/sakurafestival.htm

External links
Official sites
Festivals all over Japan—Japan Atlas
List All Japanese Festivals in the United States
Japan National Tourist Organization (photo library)
UNESCO Intangible Heritage : Yama, Hoko, Yatai, float festivals in Japan – UNESCO
Matsuri sites
Matsuri Festival in Phoenix, Arizona
Matsuri Photos of Shinto shrine (English version)
Subaru Cherry Blossom Festival of Greater Philadelphia 
Matsuri Calendar(Japanese)
Private initiative sites/galleries
JCITI.COM about Nagoya, see festivals section.
Reggie.net—photographs of Neputa floats in Hirosaki.
Description of the Odawara Omatsuri festival—archived.
The Digital Matsuri Project—Japanese festival videos
Public sites/galleries
Matsuri Brisbane photographs, State Library of Queensland

Shinto festivals
Japanese culture

Shinto
Traditional holidays